Isochariesthes suturalis is a species of beetle in the family Cerambycidae. It was described by Per Olof Christopher Aurivillius in 1914. It is known from Cameroon.

References

Endemic fauna of Cameroon
suturalis
Beetles described in 1914